Lina Axelsson Kihlblom (born 24 June 1970) is a Swedish politician for the Social Democratic party. From 30 November 2021 to 17 October 2022, she was the minister for schooling in Magdalena Andersson's cabinet. She is the first transgender cabinet minister in Swedish history. She transitioned in 1995.

During her transition, she studied and graduated with a Candidate of Law, and learned foreign languages. She has worked in Brussels with European Union law, and in the Swedish school system. After discussing her leadership of Ronna School in Södertälje on a Swedish Educational Broadcasting Company programme, she became known as the "Super-principal". She was also a member of the 2015 governmental School Commission.

References

1970 births
Living people
Transgender politicians
Swedish transgender people
Swedish LGBT politicians
Swedish Ministers for Schools
Women government ministers of Sweden